The Parliament of Romania is the national bicameral legislature of Romania, consisting of the Chamber of Deputies and the Senate. It meets at the Palace of the Parliament in Bucharest, the capital of the country.

Prior to the modification of the Constitution in 2003, the two houses had identical attributes. A text of a law had to be approved by both houses. If the text differed, a special commission was formed by deputies and senators, that "negotiated" between the two houses the form of the future law. The report of this commission had to be approved in a joint session of the Parliament.

After the 2003 referendum, a law still has to be approved by both houses, but each house has designated matters it gets to deliberate before the other, in capacity of "deciding chamber". If that first chamber adopts a law proposal (relating to its competences), it is passed on to the other one, which can approve or reject. If it makes amendments, the bill is sent back to the deciding chamber, the decision of which is final.

In 2009, a referendum was held to consult the population about turning the parliament into a unicameral body and reducing the number of representatives to 300. Although the referendum passed, the results are not binding, a referendum explicitly mentioning the modification of the constitution being required to achieve this.

History 

The parliamentary history of Romania starts in May 1831 in Wallachia, where a constitutional document was adopted, Regulamentul Organic ("The Organic Statute" or "The Organic Regulation"); less than a year later, in January 1832, this same statute was implemented in Moldavia as well. The organic regulation laid the foundations for the parliamentary institution in the Romanian Principalities.

The Paris Convention of 19 August 1858 and, especially, Statutul Dezvoltător ("The Expanding Statute") of that convention (which introduced a bicameral parliament, by founding Corpul Ponderator, later renamed Senat), adopted on the initiative of prince (Domnitor) Alexandru Ioan Cuza, by means of a plebiscite in 1864, perfected and enlarged the principle of national representation. Under the political regime established by the Paris Convention, the legislative power faced an obvious process of modernization, and the legislative power as National Representation, which operated in accordance with the organization and operation mode of parliaments in Western Europe at that time.

The historical process of formation of the Parliament of Romania in the modern age strongly boosted the affirmation of national sovereignty, subsequently leading to the Union of the two Principalities, in 1859. Under the dome of the Romanian Parliament, on 9 May 1877, the Declaration of Romania's Independence was read, and, in 1920, the documents of union with Transylvania and Bessarabia under the Treaty of Trianon were read, the formal beginning of Greater Romania.

In February 1938, amid the rather chaotic European political association that eventually led to World War II, King Carol II, who always tended to favor his own personal rule over parliamentarism, imposed a rule of authoritarian monarchy. Under the royal dictatorship, the parliament became merely a decorative body, deprived of its main attributes.

Carol abdicated in September 1940, and the succeeding National Legionary State suspended parliament. The National Legionary State as such lasted less than five months, but it was succeeded by Ion Antonescu's military dictatorship, and parliament remained suspended. After 23 August 1944, under the pressure of Soviet and other communist forces, the parliament was re-organized as a single legislative body, the Assembly of Deputies, changed under the 1948 constitution, into the Great National Assembly, a merely formal body, totally subordinate to the power of the Romanian Communist Party (PCR).

The Romanian Revolution of December 1989 opened the road for Romanians to restore authentic pluralistic electoral democracy, respecting human rights, and observing the separation of powers and the rulers' responsibility before representative bodies. Thanks to the documents issued by the provisional revolutionary power, Romania has returned to a bicameral parliamentary system. All these stipulations can be found in the country's new Constitution, approved by referendum in 1991.

During more than a decade of post-communist transition, the Chamber of Deputies and Senate debated and adopted numerous laws and regulations aimed at reforming the entire society on a democratic basis, guaranteeing respect of fundamental human rights, promoting reform and privatization, consolidating market economic institutions and those of a state ruled by law, which led to Romania's integration into such institutions as the North Atlantic Treaty Organization (NATO) and the European Union (EU).

List of presidents of the Houses 

Last election of the President of the Chamber of Deputies: November 2021

The 1866, 1923, and 1938 Constitution of Romania state that the assembly presidents are elected at the beginning of each session. This tradition was kept in the early years of the People's Republic. In modern times, both presidents of the Chamber of Deputies and of the Senate are elected for the entire duration of that house's term. Under special circumstances the presidents of the houses can be revoked.

The political stance of the presidents of the assembly prior to the development of a modern party system is shown by:

The political stance of the presidents of the assembly after the development of a modern party system is shown by:

19th century

20th century

21st century

Functioning
Prior to the modifications of the Constitution in 2003, the two houses had identical attributes. A text of a law had to be approved by both houses. If the text differed, a special commission (comisie de mediere) was formed by deputies and senators, that "negotiated" between the two houses the form of the future law. The report of this commission had to be approved in a joint session of the Parliament. This French procedure proved to be extremely long and inefficient with respect to the expectations of the Romanians towards democracy.

After the 2003 referendum, a law still has to be approved by both houses, but in some matters one is "superior" to the other, being called "decision chamber" ("cameră decizională"). This eliminates the process of "negotiation" between the two houses, and keeps the Senate as the upper house and the Chamber as the lower house.

Committees 
Committees of the Chamber of Deputies (15):
– The committee for legal affairs, appointments, discipline, immunities and validations;  – Committee on Budget, finance, banking and capital market;  – The commission for economy, industry and services;  – Committee on Agriculture, Forestry and Rural Development;  – The Committee on Foreign Affairs;  – Committee on public administration, the territory and environmental protection;  – The commission for defense, public order and national security;  – Commission for work, family and social protection;  – Committee for Education, Science, Youth and Sports;  – Committee on Public Health;  – Committee for culture, art and media information in the table;  – Commission on Human Rights, religious and minority;  – The Committee on Equal Opportunities;  – Commission for privatization and management of state assets;  – Committee on research abuses, corruption and petitions.

Committees of the Senate (14): 
– Committee for Economic Policy, Reform, and Privatization;  – Committee for Budget, Finance, and, Banks, Committee for Industries and Services, Committee for Agriculture, Forestry, Food Industry and Specific Services;  – Committee for Human Rights, Cults and National Minorities Issues;  – Committee for Public Administration Territorial Planning and Ecological Balance;  – Committee for Labour and Social Protection, Committee for Health and Family;  – Committee for Education, Science, Youth, and Sport;  – Committee for Culture, Arts, Mass Information Means;  – Committee for Legal Matters, Discipline, and Immunities;  – Committee for Defense Public Order, and National Security;  – Committee for Foreign Policy;  – Committee for the Investigation of Abuses, Corrupt Practices, and for Petitions;  – Committee for Standing Orders;  – Committee for information technologies and communications;  – Committee on Equal Opportunities for Women and Men.

Joint committees :
Standing committees:
– The Committee on European Affairs;  – The former Committee for European Integration;  – The Joint Standing Committee of the Chamber of Deputies and the Senate for the exercise of parliamentary control over the activity of the Romanian Intelligent Service;  – The Joint Standing Committee of the Chamber of Deputies and the Senate for the exercise of parliamentary control over the activity of the Foreign Intelligent Service;  – The Parliamentary Committee for the control of the implementation of the Law no.42/1990 for honoring the martyr heroes and granting rights to their successors, to the persons wounded in, and to the fighters for the victory of the Revolution of December 1990;  – The Joint Standing Committee of the Chamber of Deputies and the Senate for the statute of the Senator and Deputy, and organizing and functioning of the joint sessions of the Chambers;  – The Joint Standing Committee of the Chamber of Deputies and the Senate for the relation with UNESCO.

Special committees: 
– The Joint Standing Committee of the Chamber of Deputies and the Senate for the elaboration of the legislative proposal regarding the election of the Chamber of Deputies and the Senate, of the President of Romania, of the authorities of the public local administration, financing of the elections campaign, and the election of the members of the European Parliament;  – The Joint Special Standing Committee of the Chamber of Deputies and the Senate for the control of the budget execution of the Court of Accounts during the year 2003;  – The Joint Special Standing Committee of the Chamber of Deputies and the Senate for establishing the antenna times for the election of the Romanian Members of the European Parliament;  – The Joint Special Standing Committee of Parliament for the antenna times for the national referendum regarding the introduction of the uninominal election of the members of the Parliament of Romania.

Inquiry committees:
– The parliamentary inquiry committee for investigations and clarifying the status of the bank accounts of Nicolae Ceaușescu;  – The parliamentary inquiry committee for investigations and clarifying the activity of ICE Dunărea;  – The parliamentary inquiry committee for investigations regarding interception of communications;  – The parliamentary inquiry committee of the Chamber of Deputies and the Senate regarding the Bordei Park;  – The parliamentary inquiry committee for investigations and clarifying the spending way of the money obtained as a 2% quota from the privatization value, destined to the building of social housing, as established by the article 44, 2nd paragraph of the Law 10/2001 regarding the judiciary regime of the buildings abusively acquired by the state in the period 6 March 1945 – 22 December 1989, republished.

Composition

2020–2024 

|- 
! style="text-align:center;" colspan=2 rowspan=2 | Party
! style="text-align:center;" colspan=2 | Election seating
! style="text-align:center;" rowspan=2 | Lost
! style="text-align:center;" rowspan=2 | Won
! style="text-align:center;" colspan=2 | Present seating
|-
! style="text-align:center;" | Seats
! style="text-align:center;" | %
! style="text-align:center;" | Seats
! style="text-align:center;" | %
|-
|  
| style="text-align:left;" | Social Democratic Party
| style="text-align:right;vertical-align:top;" | 47
| style="text-align:right;vertical-align:top;" | 34.55%
| style="text-align:right;vertical-align:top;" | 2
| style="text-align:right;vertical-align:top;" | 1
| style="text-align:right;vertical-align:top;" | 46
| style="text-align:right;vertical-align:top;" | 33.82%
|-
|  
| style="text-align:left;" | National Liberal Party
| style="text-align:right;vertical-align:top;" | 41
| style="text-align:right;vertical-align:top;" | 30.14%
| style="text-align:right;vertical-align:top;" | 4
| style="text-align:right;vertical-align:top;" | 0
| style="text-align:right;vertical-align:top;" | 37
| style="text-align:right;vertical-align:top;" | 27.20%
|-
| ! style="background-color: " | 
| style="text-align:left;" | Save Romania Union
| style="text-align:right;vertical-align:top;" | 25
| style="text-align:right;vertical-align:top;" | 18.38%
| style="text-align:right;vertical-align:top;" | 3
| style="text-align:right;vertical-align:top;" | 0
| style="text-align:right;vertical-align:top;" | 22
| style="text-align:right;vertical-align:top;" | 16.17%
|- 
| ! style="background-color: " | 
| style="text-align:left;" | Alliance for the Union of Romanians
| style="text-align:right;vertical-align:top;" | 14
| style="text-align:right;vertical-align:top;" | 10.29%
| style="text-align:right;vertical-align:top;" | 2
| style="text-align:right;vertical-align:top;" | 0
| style="text-align:right;vertical-align:top;" | 12
| style="text-align:right;vertical-align:top;" | 8.82%
|-
|  
| style="text-align:left;" | Democratic Alliance of Hungarians in Romania
| style="text-align:right;vertical-align:top;" | 9
| style="text-align:right;vertical-align:top;" | 6.61%
| style="text-align:right;vertical-align:top;" | 0
| style="text-align:right;vertical-align:top;" | 0
| style="text-align:right;vertical-align:top;" | 9
| style="text-align:right;vertical-align:top;" | 6.61%
|-
|  
| style="text-align:left;" | Force of the Right
| style="text-align:right;vertical-align:top;" | —
| style="text-align:right;vertical-align:top;" | —
| style="text-align:right;vertical-align:top;" | 0
| style="text-align:right;vertical-align:top;" | 3
| style="text-align:right;vertical-align:top;" | 3
| style="text-align:right;vertical-align:top;" | 2.20%
|-
| ! style="background-color: " | 
| style="text-align:left;" | Social Liberal Humanist Party
| style="text-align:right;vertical-align:top;" | —
| style="text-align:right;vertical-align:top;" | —
| style="text-align:right;vertical-align:top;" | 0
| style="text-align:right;vertical-align:top;" | 1
| style="text-align:right;vertical-align:top;" | 1
| style="text-align:right;vertical-align:top;" | 0.73%
|- 
| ! style="background-color: " | 
| style="text-align:left;" | Romanian Nationhood Party
| style="text-align:right;vertical-align:top;" | —
| style="text-align:right;vertical-align:top;" | —
| style="text-align:right;vertical-align:top;" | 0
| style="text-align:right;vertical-align:top;" | 1
| style="text-align:right;vertical-align:top;" | 1
| style="text-align:right;vertical-align:top;" | 0.73%
|-
|  
| style="text-align:left;" | Independents
| style="text-align:right;vertical-align:top;" | —
| style="text-align:right;vertical-align:top;" | —
| style="text-align:right;vertical-align:top;" | 2
| style="text-align:right;vertical-align:top;" | 3
| style="text-align:right;vertical-align:top;" | 5
| style="text-align:right;vertical-align:top;" | 3.67%
|-
! align=left colspan=2|Total
! 136
! 100
! colspan=2 | —
! 136
! 100
|}

|- 
! style="text-align:center;" colspan=2 rowspan=2 | Party
! style="text-align:center;" colspan=2 | Election seating
! style="text-align:center;" rowspan=2 | Lost
! style="text-align:center;" rowspan=2 | Won
! style="text-align:center;" colspan=2 | Present seating
|-
! style="text-align:center;" | Seats
! style="text-align:center;" | %
! style="text-align:center;" | Seats
! style="text-align:center;" | %
|-
|  
| style="text-align:left;" | Social Democratic Party
| style="text-align:right;vertical-align:top;" | 110
| style="text-align:right;vertical-align:top;" | 33.33%
| style="text-align:right;vertical-align:top;" | 7
| style="text-align:right;vertical-align:top;" | 1
| style="text-align:right;vertical-align:top;" | 104
| style="text-align:right;vertical-align:top;" | 31.51%
|-
|  
| style="text-align:left;" | National Liberal Party
| style="text-align:right;vertical-align:top;" | 93
| style="text-align:right;vertical-align:top;" | 28.18%
| style="text-align:right;vertical-align:top;" | 16
| style="text-align:right;vertical-align:top;" | 3
| style="text-align:right;vertical-align:top;" | 80
| style="text-align:right;vertical-align:top;" | 24.24%
|-
| ! style="background-color: #00AAE7" | 
| style="text-align:left;" | Save Romania Union
| style="text-align:right;vertical-align:top;" | 55
| style="text-align:right;vertical-align:top;" | 16.66%
| style="text-align:right;vertical-align:top;" | 11
| style="text-align:right;vertical-align:top;" | 0
| style="text-align:right;vertical-align:top;" | 44
| style="text-align:right;vertical-align:top;" | 13.33%
|- 
| ! style="background-color: " | 
| style="text-align:left;" | Alliance for the Union of Romanians
| style="text-align:right;vertical-align:top;" | 33
| style="text-align:right;vertical-align:top;" | 10.00%
| style="text-align:right;vertical-align:top;" | 10
| style="text-align:right;vertical-align:top;" | 1
| style="text-align:right;vertical-align:top;" | 24
| style="text-align:right;vertical-align:top;" | 7.27%
|-
|  
| style="text-align:left;" | Democratic Alliance of Hungarians in Romania
| style="text-align:right;vertical-align:top;" | 21
| style="text-align:right;vertical-align:top;" | 6.36%
| style="text-align:right;vertical-align:top;" | 1
| style="text-align:right;vertical-align:top;" | 0
| style="text-align:right;vertical-align:top;" | 20
| style="text-align:right;vertical-align:top;" | 6.06%
|-
| ! style="background-color: #000000" | 
| style="text-align:left;" | Parties of ethnic minorities
| style="text-align:right;vertical-align:top;" | 18
| style="text-align:right;vertical-align:top;" | 5.45%
| style="text-align:right;vertical-align:top;" | 1
| style="text-align:right;vertical-align:top;" | 1
| style="text-align:right;vertical-align:top;" | 18
| style="text-align:right;vertical-align:top;" | 5.45%
|-
|  
| style="text-align:left;" | Force of the Right
| style="text-align:right;vertical-align:top;" | —
| style="text-align:right;vertical-align:top;" | —
| style="text-align:right;vertical-align:top;" | 1
| style="text-align:right;vertical-align:top;" | 17
| style="text-align:right;vertical-align:top;" | 16
| style="text-align:right;vertical-align:top;" | 4.84%
|-
| ! style="background-color: #c40075" | 
| style="text-align:left;" | Renewing Romania's European Project
| style="text-align:right;vertical-align:top;" | —
| style="text-align:right;vertical-align:top;" | —
| style="text-align:right;vertical-align:top;" | 0
| style="text-align:right;vertical-align:top;" | 10
| style="text-align:right;vertical-align:top;" | 10
| style="text-align:right;vertical-align:top;" | 3.03%
|-
| ! style="background-color: #0066B6" | 
| style="text-align:left;" | Social Liberal Humanist Party
| style="text-align:right;vertical-align:top;" | —
| style="text-align:right;vertical-align:top;" | —
| style="text-align:right;vertical-align:top;" | 0
| style="text-align:right;vertical-align:top;" | 4
| style="text-align:right;vertical-align:top;" | 4
| style="text-align:right;vertical-align:top;" | 1.21%
|- 
| ! style="background-color: " | 
| style="text-align:left;" | Romanian Nationhood Party
| style="text-align:right;vertical-align:top;" | —
| style="text-align:right;vertical-align:top;" | —
| style="text-align:right;vertical-align:top;" | 0
| style="text-align:right;vertical-align:top;" | 4
| style="text-align:right;vertical-align:top;" | 4
| style="text-align:right;vertical-align:top;" | 1.21%
|-
| ! style="background-color: " |
| style="text-align:left;" | The Right Alternative
| style="text-align:right;vertical-align:top;" | —
| style="text-align:right;vertical-align:top;" | —
| style="text-align:right;vertical-align:top;" | 0
| style="text-align:right;vertical-align:top;" | 3
| style="text-align:right;vertical-align:top;" | 3
| style="text-align:right;vertical-align:top;" | 0.90%
|-
| ! style="background-color: " | 
| style="text-align:left;" | Alliance for the Homeland
| style="text-align:right;vertical-align:top;" | —
| style="text-align:right;vertical-align:top;" | —
| style="text-align:right;vertical-align:top;" | 0
| style="text-align:right;vertical-align:top;" | 1
| style="text-align:right;vertical-align:top;" | 1
| style="text-align:right;vertical-align:top;" | 0.30%
|-
| ! style="background-color: " |
| style="text-align:left;" | Association of Italians of Romania
| style="text-align:right;vertical-align:top;" | —
| style="text-align:right;vertical-align:top;" | —
| style="text-align:right;vertical-align:top;" | 0
| style="text-align:right;vertical-align:top;" | 1
| style="text-align:right;vertical-align:top;" | 1
| style="text-align:right;vertical-align:top;" | 0.30%
|-
|  
| style="text-align:left;" | Independents
| style="text-align:right;vertical-align:top;" | —
| style="text-align:right;vertical-align:top;" | —
| style="text-align:right;vertical-align:top;" | 13
| style="text-align:right;vertical-align:top;" | 14
| style="text-align:right;vertical-align:top;" | 1
| style="text-align:right;vertical-align:top;" | 0.30%
|-
! align=left colspan=2|Total
! 330
! 100
! colspan=2 | —
! 330
! 100
|}

2016–2020 

|- 
! style="text-align:center;" colspan=2 rowspan=2 | Party
! style="text-align:center;" colspan=2 | Election seating
! style="text-align:center;" rowspan=2 | Lost
! style="text-align:center;" rowspan=2 | Won
! style="text-align:center;" colspan=2 | End seating
|-
! style="text-align:center;" | Seats
! style="text-align:center;" | %
! style="text-align:center;" | Seats
! style="text-align:center;" | %
|-
|  
| style="text-align:left;" | Social Democratic Party
| style="text-align:right;vertical-align:top;" | 67
| style="text-align:right;vertical-align:top;" | 49.26%
| style="text-align:right;vertical-align:top;" | 10
| style="text-align:right;vertical-align:top;" | 2
| style="text-align:right;vertical-align:top;" | 59
| style="text-align:right;vertical-align:top;" | 43.38%
|-
|  
| style="text-align:left;" | National Liberal Party
| style="text-align:right;vertical-align:top;" | 30
| style="text-align:right;vertical-align:top;" | 22.05%
| style="text-align:right;vertical-align:top;" | 4
| style="text-align:right;vertical-align:top;" | 0
| style="text-align:right;vertical-align:top;" | 26
| style="text-align:right;vertical-align:top;" | 19.11%
|-
|  
| style="text-align:left;" | Save Romania Union
| style="text-align:right;vertical-align:top;" | 13
| style="text-align:right;vertical-align:top;" | 9.55%
| style="text-align:right;vertical-align:top;" | 0
| style="text-align:right;vertical-align:top;" | 0
| style="text-align:right;vertical-align:top;" | 13
| style="text-align:right;vertical-align:top;" | 9.55%
|-
|  
| style="text-align:left;" | Democratic Alliance of Hungarians in Romania
| style="text-align:right;vertical-align:top;" | 9
| style="text-align:right;vertical-align:top;" | 6.61%
| style="text-align:right;vertical-align:top;" | 1
| style="text-align:right;vertical-align:top;" | 1
| style="text-align:right;vertical-align:top;" | 9
| style="text-align:right;vertical-align:top;" | 6.61%
|-
|  
| style="text-align:left;" | Alliance of Liberals and Democrats
| style="text-align:right;vertical-align:top;" | 9
| style="text-align:right;vertical-align:top;" | 6.61%
| style="text-align:right;vertical-align:top;" | 5
| style="text-align:right;vertical-align:top;" | 3
| style="text-align:right;vertical-align:top;" | 7
| style="text-align:right;vertical-align:top;" | 5.14%
|-
|  
| style="text-align:left;" | People's Movement Party
| style="text-align:right;vertical-align:top;" | 8
| style="text-align:right;vertical-align:top;" | 5.88%
| style="text-align:right;vertical-align:top;" | 4
| style="text-align:right;vertical-align:top;" | 1
| style="text-align:right;vertical-align:top;" | 5
| style="text-align:right;vertical-align:top;" | 3.67%
|-
|  
| style="text-align:left;" | Humanist Power Party
| style="text-align:right;vertical-align:top;" | —
| style="text-align:right;vertical-align:top;" | —
| style="text-align:right;vertical-align:top;" | 0
| style="text-align:right;vertical-align:top;" | 2
| style="text-align:right;vertical-align:top;" | 2
| style="text-align:right;vertical-align:top;" | 1.47%
|-
|  
| style="text-align:left;" | Independents
| style="text-align:right;vertical-align:top;" | —
| style="text-align:right;vertical-align:top;" | —
| style="text-align:right;vertical-align:top;" | 0
| style="text-align:right;vertical-align:top;" | 15
| style="text-align:right;vertical-align:top;" | 15
| style="text-align:right;vertical-align:top;" | 11.02%
|-
! align=left colspan=2|Total
! 136
! 100
! colspan=2 | —
! 136
! 100
|}

|- 
! style="text-align:center;" colspan=2 rowspan=2 | Party
! style="text-align:center;" colspan=2 | Election seating
! style="text-align:center;" rowspan=2 | Lost
! style="text-align:center;" rowspan=2 | Won
! style="text-align:center;" colspan=2 | End seating
|-
! style="text-align:center;" | Seats
! style="text-align:center;" | %
! style="text-align:center;" | Seats
! style="text-align:center;" | %
|-
|  
| style="text-align:left;" | Social Democratic Party
| style="text-align:right;vertical-align:top;" | 154
| style="text-align:right;vertical-align:top;" | 46.8%
| style="text-align:right;vertical-align:top;" | 65
| style="text-align:right;vertical-align:top;" | 28
| style="text-align:right;vertical-align:top;" | 117
| style="text-align:right;vertical-align:top;" | 35.56%
|-
|  
| style="text-align:left;" | National Liberal Party
| style="text-align:right;vertical-align:top;" | 69
| style="text-align:right;vertical-align:top;" | 20.97%
| style="text-align:right;vertical-align:top;" | 6
| style="text-align:right;vertical-align:top;" | 3
| style="text-align:right;vertical-align:top;" | 66
| style="text-align:right;vertical-align:top;" | 20.06%
|-
|  
| style="text-align:left;" | Save Romania Union
| style="text-align:right;vertical-align:top;" | 30
| style="text-align:right;vertical-align:top;" | 9.11%
| style="text-align:right;vertical-align:top;" | 11
| style="text-align:right;vertical-align:top;" | 6
| style="text-align:right;vertical-align:top;" | 25
| style="text-align:right;vertical-align:top;" | 7.59%
|-
|  
| style="text-align:left;" | Democratic Alliance of Hungarians in Romania
| style="text-align:right;vertical-align:top;" | 21
| style="text-align:right;vertical-align:top;" | 6.38%
| style="text-align:right;vertical-align:top;" | 1
| style="text-align:right;vertical-align:top;" | 0
| style="text-align:right;vertical-align:top;" | 20
| style="text-align:right;vertical-align:top;" | 6.07%
|-
|  
| style="text-align:left;" | Alliance of Liberals and Democrats
| style="text-align:right;vertical-align:top;" | 20
| style="text-align:right;vertical-align:top;" | 6.07%
| style="text-align:right;vertical-align:top;" | 10
| style="text-align:right;vertical-align:top;" | 4
| style="text-align:right;vertical-align:top;" | 14
| style="text-align:right;vertical-align:top;" | 4.26%
|-
|  
| style="text-align:left;" | People's Movement Party
| style="text-align:right;vertical-align:top;" | 18
| style="text-align:right;vertical-align:top;" | 5.47%
| style="text-align:right;vertical-align:top;" | 9
| style="text-align:right;vertical-align:top;" | 6
| style="text-align:right;vertical-align:top;" | 15
| style="text-align:right;vertical-align:top;" | 4.55%
|-
| ! style="background-color: #000000" | 
| style="text-align:left;" | Parties of ethnic minorities
| style="text-align:right;vertical-align:top;" | 17
| style="text-align:right;vertical-align:top;" | 5.17%
| style="text-align:right;vertical-align:top;" | 0
| style="text-align:right;vertical-align:top;" | 0
| style="text-align:right;vertical-align:top;" | 17
| style="text-align:right;vertical-align:top;" | 5.17%
|-
| ! style="background-color:  | 
| style="text-align:left;" | PRO Romania
| style="text-align:right;vertical-align:top;" | —
| style="text-align:right;vertical-align:top;" | —
| style="text-align:right;vertical-align:top;" | 0
| style="text-align:right;vertical-align:top;" | 21
| style="text-align:right;vertical-align:top;" | 21
| style="text-align:right;vertical-align:top;" | 6.38%
|-
|  
| style="text-align:left;" | Humanist Power Party
| style="text-align:right;vertical-align:top;" | —
| style="text-align:right;vertical-align:top;" | —
| style="text-align:right;vertical-align:top;" | 0
| style="text-align:right;vertical-align:top;" | 7
| style="text-align:right;vertical-align:top;" | 7
| style="text-align:right;vertical-align:top;" | 2.12%
|-
|  
| style="text-align:left;" | Independents
| style="text-align:right;vertical-align:top;" | —
| style="text-align:right;vertical-align:top;" | —
| style="text-align:right;vertical-align:top;" | 11
| style="text-align:right;vertical-align:top;" | 38
| style="text-align:right;vertical-align:top;" | 27
| style="text-align:right;vertical-align:top;" | 10.94%
|-
! align=left colspan=2|Total
! 329
! 100
! colspan=2 | —
! 329
! 100
|}

2012–2016

2008–2012

2004–2008 

The figures in the table below denote only the seats in the Chamber of Deputies:

2000–2004 

The figures in the table below denote only the seats in the Chamber of Deputies:

1996–2000 

The figures in the table below denote only the seats in the Chamber of Deputies:

1992–1996 

The figures in the table below denote only the seats in the Chamber of Deputies:

1990–1992 

The figures in the table below denote only the seats in the Chamber of Deputies:

Notes

References 

 CV at the Chamber of Deputies of Romania
 CV at the Chamber of Deputies of Romania

External links
 Senate of Romania
 Chamber of Deputies of Romania

 
Politics of Romania
Romania
Romania
Romania
1862 establishments in Romania